Granite Springs may refer to:
Granite Springs, California, in Mariposa County
Granite Springs, California, former name of Coso (former settlement), California, in Inyo County
Granite Springs, New York
Granite Springs Valley (Nevada), a Great Basin watershed
Granite Springs, Virginia, in Spotsylvania County